Audrey's Kitchen is a satirical television cooking series produced by Working Dog Productions in Melbourne, Australia, for ABC Television.  Each episode is only three minutes in length and features fictional writer, chef, life coach and choreographer Audrey Gordon, played by Australian actress Heidi Arena.  The first series of ten episodes aired in 2012. The second series started airing in 2013.

References

External links
 Audrey's Kitchen program page on Australian Broadcasting Corporation website
 Audrey's Kitchen website

2012 Australian television series debuts
Australian Broadcasting Corporation original programming
Australian cooking television series
Australian television chefs